Basic Instinct is a 1992 neo-noir erotic thriller film directed by Paul Verhoeven and written by Joe Eszterhas. The film follows San Francisco police detective Nick Curran (Michael Douglas) as he investigates the brutal murder of a wealthy rock star. During the course of the investigation, Curran becomes entangled in a passionate and intense relationship with Catherine Tramell (Sharon Stone), the prime suspect and an enigmatic writer.

The script for Basic Instinct was developed by Eszterhas in the 1980s, and it became the subject of a bidding war until Carolco Pictures secured the rights to the film. Verhoeven was then brought on to direct, and after considering several actresses for the role of Tramell, Douglas and Stone joined the project.

Prior to its release, Basic Instinct generated controversy due to its explicit sexual content and violence, including a rape scene. Gay rights activists criticized the film for its depiction of homosexual relationships and its portrayal of a bisexual woman as a murderous psychopath. The film's most infamous scene features Stone crossing her legs, with her vulva briefly visible, which she claimed was filmed without her knowledge. However, Verhoeven denies this claim.

Basic Instinct premiered in Los Angeles on March 18, 1992, and was released in the United States by TriStar Pictures on March 20, 1992. Although the film received mixed reviews from critics, who praised the performances of the cast, original score, and editing, but criticized its writing and character development, and despite public protest, Basic Instinct was a commercial success, grossing $352 million worldwide. It was the fourth-highest-grossing film of 1992, behind Disney's Aladdin, The Bodyguard, and Home Alone 2: Lost in New York.

Numerous versions of the film have been released on videocassette, DVD, and Blu-ray, including a director's cut with extended footage previously unseen in North American cinemas.

The film was later recognized for its groundbreaking depictions of sexuality in mainstream Hollywood cinema and was described by one scholar as "a neo-film noir masterpiece that plays with, and transgresses, the narrative rules of film noir."

A sequel, Basic Instinct 2, was released 14 years later, starring Stone but made without Verhoeven's involvement. It received negative reviews and was relatively unsuccessful.

Plot 

Homicide detective Nick Curran investigates the murder of retired rock star Johnny Boz in San Francisco. Boz was stabbed to death with an ice pick while having sex with a mysterious blonde woman. Nick's prime suspect is Boz's girlfriend, crime novelist Catherine Tramell, whose novel mirrors the crime. It's unclear whether Catherine is the murderer or someone is trying to frame her. Catherine is uncooperative and taunts the investigators by smoking and exposing herself during interrogation. Although she passes a lie detector test and is released, Nick discovers that Catherine has a history of befriending murderers. This includes Roxy Hardy, Catherine's girlfriend who impulsively killed her two younger brothers at the age of 16, and Hazel Dobkins, who killed her husband and children for no apparent reason.

Nick, who accidentally shot two tourists while high on cocaine during an undercover assignment, attends counseling sessions with Police Psychologist Dr. Beth Garner. Nick and Beth have an on-and-off affair. Meanwhile, Nick discovers that Catherine is using him as the basis for the protagonist of her latest book, in which his character is murdered after falling for the wrong woman. Nick becomes suspicious that Catherine has bribed Lt. Marty Nielsen of Internal Affairs for information from his psychiatric file. He believes that Beth had previously given his file to Nielsen after he threatened to recommend Nick's termination. In response, Nick assaults Nielsen in his office. Later on, Nielsen is found murdered, and Nick becomes a prime suspect. Nick suspects Catherine for Nielsen's murder. However, when his behavior deteriorates, he is put on leave.

Nick and Catherine embark on a passionate but tense affair that feels like a cat-and-mouse game. One night, Nick sees Catherine snorting cocaine with Roxy and another man at a club. They dance and make out before returning to Catherine's place, where they are observed by Roxy having rough sex, with Catherine tying Nick to the bed with a white silk scarf. Though Catherine doesn't kill him, this scene mirrors the way Boz was tied up by the mystery blonde. Jealous of Nick, Roxy tries to run him over with Catherine's car but dies when the vehicle crashes. Catherine is deeply saddened by Roxy's death and confesses to Nick about a college encounter with a girl that ended badly. According to Catherine, the girl became obsessed with her, leading Nick to believe that Catherine may not have killed Boz. Nick later identifies the girl as Beth, and she acknowledges the encounter but claims that it was Catherine who became obsessed. Furthermore, Nick discovers that a college professor of Catherine and Beth's was killed with an ice pick in an unsolved homicide that inspired one of Catherine's early novels.

Nick discovers the final pages of Catherine's book, where the fictional detective finds his partner's body in an elevator. Catherine breaks off their affair, leaving Nick upset and suspicious. Nick meets his partner, Gus Moran, who has arranged to meet Catherine's college roommate at an office building to reveal what went on between Catherine and Beth. While Nick waits in the car, Gus is stabbed to death with an ice pick in the elevator. Recalling the book's final pages, Nick runs into the building and finds Gus' body in a manner similar to the scene described. Beth arrives unexpectedly and claims that she received a message to meet Gus. Nick suspects Beth of killing Gus and shoots her when he believes she's reaching for a gun. However, he later discovers that Beth was only fiddling with an ornament on her keychain.

Evidence collected from the scene and Beth's apartment implicates her in the murders of Boz, Nielsen, Moran, and her own husband. The investigators also find collections of photos and newspaper clippings of Catherine that imply an obsession with her. Nick is left confused and dejected. When he returns to his apartment, Catherine meets him and explains her reluctance to commit to him due to her loved ones dying. However, they have sex and discuss their future. As they do, an ice pick is revealed to be under the bed.

Cast 

 Michael Douglas as Detective Nick Curran
 Sharon Stone as Catherine Tramell
 George Dzundza as Detective Gus Moran
 Jeanne Tripplehorn as Dr. Beth Garner
 Denis Arndt as Lieutenant Phillip Walker
 Leilani Sarelle as Roxanne "Roxy" Hardy
 Bruce A. Young as Andrews
 Chelcie Ross as Captain Talcott
 Dorothy Malone as Hazel Dobkins
 Wayne Knight as John Correli
 Daniel von Bargen as Lieutenant Marty Nielsen 
 Stephen Tobolowsky as Dr. Lamott
 Benjamin Mouton as Harrigan
 Jack McGee as Sheriff
 Bill Cable as Johnny Boz
 James Rebhorn as Dr. McElwaine

Production 
The screenplay, which was written in the 1980s, sparked a bidding war until it was finally purchased by Carolco Pictures for US$3 million. Eszterhas, who had previously been the creative force behind several blockbuster films such as Flashdance (1983) and Jagged Edge (1985), managed to complete the script in just 13 days. However, Verhoeven had suggested changes to the script that Eszterhas strongly disagreed with, including a lesbian sex scene that Eszterhas deemed "exploitative." With Verhoeven unwilling to budge, Eszterhas and producer Irwin Winkler left the production.

Gary Goldman was subsequently brought on board to rewrite the script four times at Verhoeven's suggestion. However, by the fourth draft, Verhoeven himself acknowledged that his proposals were "undramatic" and "really stupid." By the fifth and final draft, the script had returned to Eszterhas' original vision, with only minor tweaks to visuals and dialogue. As a result, Joe Eszterhas received sole writing credit for the film.

In preparation for the car chase scene, Douglas drove up the steps on Kearny Street in San Francisco for four nights by himself. Douglas recommended Kim Basinger for the role of Catherine Tramell, but she declined. He also suggested Julia Roberts, Greta Scacchi, and Meg Ryan, but they all turned down the role. The same happened with Michelle Pfeiffer, Geena Davis, Kathleen Turner, Kelly Lynch, Ellen Barkin, and Mariel Hemingway. Verhoeven considered Demi Moore, but ultimately chose Stone, who was relatively unknown at the time. However, Stone had previously worked with Verhoeven on Total Recall. He was particularly struck by the way she quickly transitioned from evil to love in a couple of seconds before her character's death in that film. Stone was paid $500,000, which was low compared to the film's production budget. Michael Douglas was determined to have another A-list actress star in the movie with him. Worried about taking the risk on his own, he said, "I need someone to share the risks of this movie. [...] I don't want to be up there all by myself. There's going to be a lot of shit flying around."

During filming in San Francisco, gay and lesbian rights activists and demonstrators attended, and the San Francisco Police Department's riot police were present at every location to manage the crowds. Protesters outside the filming locations held signs that said "Honk if you love the 49ers" and "Honk if you love men." The protesters used lasers and whistles to interfere with the filming. Although the police were present on set and a restraining order was in place, producer Alan Marshall personally identified each protester he wanted arrested. This disrupted production, leading to Marshall's citizen's arrest. However, this did not result in any action by the local police department.

In one scene, Stone's vulva was filmed as she crossed her legs. Stone later said she was told that her lack of underwear would only be alluded to and not shown. She had been wearing white underwear until Verhoeven said they reflected light on the camera lens and asked her to remove them, assuring her that only a shadow would be visible. Stone stated that it was not until she saw the film in a screening room with a test audience that she became aware of the visible nudity, leading her to slap Verhoeven in the face and leave the screening. Verhoeven denied her claim, stating that she was fully aware in advance that her vulva would be filmed.

Jeanne Tripplehorn has said that the notorious scene in which her character and Douglas' had brutal, bruising sex was somewhat "lighter" when described to her by Verhoeven before shooting.

Music

Soundtrack 

The musical score for Basic Instinct was composed by Jerry Goldsmith and earned him nominations for an Academy Award and a Golden Globe Award. Goldsmith described the process as challenging, stating, "Basic Instinct was probably the most difficult [score] I've ever done. It's a very convoluted story with very unorthodox characters. It's a murder mystery, but it isn't really a murder mystery. The director, Paul Verhoeven, had a very clear idea of how the woman should be, and I had a hard time getting it. Because of Paul pushing me, I think it's one of the best scores I've ever written. It was a true collaboration."

In terms of featured music, commercially released tracks played a minor role in the film. The club scene prominently features "Blue" by Chicago house music performer LaTour and "Rave the Rhythm" by the group Channel X, as well as "Movin' on Up" by Jeff Barry and Ja'Net DuBois. Chris Rea's "Looking for the Summer" is heard during a scene between Douglas and his partner at Mac's Diner.

The film's official soundtrack was released on March 17, 1992. In 2004, Prometheus Records issued an expanded version of Goldsmith's score, which included previously omitted sections and alternative compositions for certain elements.

Release

Theatrical

The film was entered into the 1992 Cannes Film Festival.

MPAA rating 
Basic Instinct is rated R for "strong violence and sensuality, and for drug use and language." Initially, the film was given an NC-17 rating by the MPAA for "graphic depictions of extremely explicit violence, sexual content and strong language." However, under pressure from TriStar and Carolco, Verhoeven cut 35 to 40 seconds from the film to achieve an R rating. Verhoeven described the changes in a March 1992 article in The New York Times:
The film was subsequently re-released in its uncut format on video and later on DVD.

Home media 
Following its theatrical version, an unrated version of the film was released on video in 1992, running at 129 minutes. In 1997, a "bare bones" DVD release containing only the R-rated version was issued, followed by a "collector's edition" DVD release in 2001. This edition contained the uncut version of the film along with a commentary by Camille Paglia and a small ice pick, the villain's weapon of choice. This version, which runs 127 minutes, was subsequently re-released twice in 2003 and 2006, respectively.

In March 2006, the unrated version, also known as the "director's cut," was re-released on DVD and labeled as the "ultimate edition." The film was released on Blu-ray in 2007 with the "director's cut" label.

The theatrical release of the film was cut by 35 to 40 seconds to avoid an NC-17 rating, with some violence and sexually explicit content removed. The missing or censored material, later released on video and DVD as the director's cut, included:
 The murder of Johnny Boz in the opening scene. In the director's cut, the killer is seen stabbing him in his neck, in the chest and through his nose. In addition, the killer is still having violent sex with him while stabbing him at the same time.
 The scene where Nick has sex with Beth is cut in the US theatrical version, as he is seen ripping off her clothes and forcing her over the couch, before a cut to the two of them lying on the floor. In the uncut version, they are seen having rougher sex.
 The scene where Nick and Catherine have sex after going to the club is longer and much more explicit in the uncut version.

Recently, in 2021, StudioCanal released a restored 4K Ultra HD 'collector's edition' of the film on Blu-ray, DVD, and digital download in the UK (June 14), Australia (July 7), and New Zealand (July 14). The restoration was supervised by the director and completed in 2019-2020, using the original 35MM negative. Additionally, a new documentary titled "Basic Instinct, Sex, Death & Stone" was added as a special feature.

Reception

Box office 
Basic Instinct opened in theaters in the United States and Canada on March 20, 1992 and became one of the highest-grossing films of that year. It debuted at number one at the US box office, grossing $15 million in its opening weekend. After briefly dropping down the charts, it returned to number one in its fifth week, where it remained for four weeks. In total, the film grossed $117.7 million in the United States and Canada. Internationally, it grossed $352,927,224, making it the fourth-highest-grossing film released in 1992 worldwide. In Italy, it had a record opening of $5.44 million and remained number one for four weeks, ultimately grossing $20 million and becoming the highest-grossing film for the year. It was the highest-grossing film in Spain of all time, with a gross of $21.6 million, and in the United Kingdom, it was number one for three weeks and the highest-grossing film for the year with a gross of £15.5 million. It was also number one for the year in France ($27 million), Germany (4.5 million admissions), South Africa ($3 million), Iceland, and Ireland. In Australia, it was number one for three weeks and the second-highest-grossing film for the year, grossing A$13.1 million.

Critical response 
Basic Instincts critical reaction was mixed. On Rotten Tomatoes, the film holds a score of 57% based on 74 reviews, with an average rating of 6.20/10 and the consensus that "Unevenly echoing the work of Alfred Hitchcock, Basic Instinct contains a star-making performance from Sharon Stone, but is ultimately undone by its problematic, overly lurid plot." On Metacritic the film holds a score of 43 based on 28 critics, indicating "mixed or average" reviews. Audiences polled by CinemaScore gave the film an average grade of "B+" on an A+ to F scale.

Janet Maslin of The New York Times praised the film, saying "Basic Instinct transfers Mr. Verhoeven's flair for action-oriented material to the realm of Hitchcockian intrigue, and the results are viscerally effective even when they don't make sense." Peter Travers of Rolling Stone also praised the film, saying it was a guilty pleasure film; he also expressed admiration for Verhoeven's direction, saying "[his] cinematic wet dream delivers the goods, especially when Sharon Stone struts on with enough come-on carnality to singe the screen," and praised Stone's performance: "Stone, a former model, is a knockout; she even got a rise out of Ah-nold in Verhoeven's Total Recall. But being the bright spot in too many dull movies (He Said, She Said; Irreconcilable Differences) stalled her career. Though Basic Instinct establishes Stone as a bombshell for the Nineties, it also shows she can nail a laugh or shade an emotion with equal aplomb."

Australian critic Shannon J. Harvey of the Sunday Times called it one of the "1990s['] finest productions, doing more for female empowerment than any feminist rally. Stone—in her star-making performance—is as hot and sexy as she is ice-pick cold."

The film had many detractors. Roger Ebert of the Chicago Sun-Times awarded it two out of four stars, saying the film was well crafted but died down in the last half-hour: "The film is like a crossword puzzle. It keeps your interest until you solve it. Then it's just a worthless scrap with the spaces filled in." Dave Kehr of the Chicago Tribune also gave a negative review, calling it psychologically empty: "Verhoeven does not explore the dark side, but merely exploits it, and that makes all the difference in the world."<ref>Kehr, Dave. "Blatant 'Instinct'''." Chicago Tribune . Retrieved June 6, 2020.</ref>

 Controversy 
The film generated controversy due to its graphic sexuality and violence, including a truncated rape scene. Gay rights activists protested during filming, saying it followed a pattern of negative depictions of homosexuals in film. Members of the lesbian and bisexual activist group LABIA protested against the film on its opening night. Others also picketed theatres to dissuade people from attending screenings, carrying signs saying "Kiss My Ice Pick", "Hollywood Promotes Anti-Gay Violence" and "Catherine Did It!"/"Save Your Money—The Bisexual Did It." Verhoeven himself defended the groups' right to protest, but criticized the disruptions they caused, saying "Fascism is not in raising your voice; the fascism is in not accepting the no."

Film critic Roger Ebert mentioned the controversy in his review, saying "As for the allegedly offensive homosexual characters: The movie's protesters might take note of the fact that this film's heterosexuals, starting with Douglas, are equally offensive. Still, there is a point to be made about Hollywood's unremitting insistence on typecasting homosexuals—particularly lesbians—as twisted and evil." Camille Paglia denounced gay activist and feminist protests against Basic Instinct, and called Sharon Stone's performance "one of the great performances by a woman in screen history", praising her character as "a great vamp figure, like Mona Lisa herself, like a pagan goddess."

The film was also criticized for glamorizing cigarette smoking. Screenwriter Joe Eszterhas was later diagnosed with throat cancer and publicly apologized for glamorizing smoking in his films.

Since the release of the film, Stone has alleged multiple times that a scene in which her vulva was exposed as she crossed her legs was filmed without her knowledge. In her Inside the Actors Studio interview in 1998, Stone said of the experience that, while she was initially angry, she realized the director's decision was the right one, saying "And I thought about it for a few days and I knew in my heart, he was right. I hated that it existed, I hated it more than he stole it from me instead of allowing me to choose. But he was right." In her 2021 memoir, Stone alleged once again that she was misled by Verhoeven with regard to the circumstance of the filming of the scene, even though she ultimately did not seek an injunction against it. Verhoeven responded that it was "impossible" and "she knew exactly what we were doing." However, despite having a "radically different" memory about the particular scene, he praised Stone's performance and said they are on good terms.

During the trial of the murder of Jun Lin, the prosecution stated that Luka Magnotta was inspired by the film and Stone's character, Catherine Tramell.

 Awards and nominations 

 See also 
 Fatal Attraction, a 1987 film exploring similar themes
 Fatal Instinct'', a 1993 film parody

References

External links 

 
 
 
 
 
 
 
 

1992 films
1992 LGBT-related films
1992 crime thriller films
1990s American films
1990s English-language films
1990s erotic thriller films
1990s feminist films
1990s mystery thriller films
1990s psychological thriller films
American crime thriller films
American erotic thriller films
American feminist films
American LGBT-related films
American mystery thriller films
American neo-noir films
American police detective films
American psychological thriller films
British crime thriller films
British erotic thriller films
British feminist films
British LGBT-related films
British mystery thriller films
British neo-noir films
British psychological thriller films
Carolco Pictures films
English-language French films
Erotic mystery films
Female bisexuality in film
Films about murderers
Films about narcissism
Films about rape
Films about sexuality
Films about writers
Films directed by Paul Verhoeven
Films scored by Jerry Goldsmith
Films set in San Francisco
Films shot in San Francisco
Films with screenplays by Joe Eszterhas
French crime thriller films
French erotic thriller films
French feminist films
French LGBT-related films
French mystery thriller films
French neo-noir films
French psychological thriller films
LGBT-related controversies in film
LGBT-related thriller films
Film controversies
Obscenity controversies in film
Rating controversies in film
StudioCanal films
TriStar Pictures films
1990s British films
1990s French films